Sultan of Sultans is the literal English translation of the Ottoman Turkish royal title Sulṭānü's-Selāṭīn. The title was firstly used by Sultan of Delhi Sultanate in Persian context.

As with various other laudatory titles of Semitic origin, such as "King of Kings", Sultan of Sultans can express a claim of imperial rank up to and including universal legitimate sovereignty. Although the notion and title of an emperor is largely alien to Islamic tradition, the Ottoman dynasty, which employed the title of "Sultan of Sultans" in its official full style, had perhaps the best claim to usage due to its territorial extent and great length. The Ottomans also adopted the traditional Byzantine imperial title Caesar for their own ruler (the Padishah).

The Sultans of Delhi Sultanate used this title to signify their rule over North India as hundred of Indian Rajas ruled under their suzerainty. But they also considered themselves beneath the Caliph however they were independent. Similarly, the Sultans of Bengal also used this title.

The Shahanshah (Persian for "King of Kings") of Iran also claimed, with slightly less legitimacy, to be the "Sultan of Sultans". These assertions were tied to the conflict between the Sunni and Shiite branches of Islam.

References

Ottoman titles